Lo Siu Kei (born 15 September 2001) is a Hong Kong professional footballer who plays as a goalkeeper for Hong Kong Premier League club Rangers.

References

External links
 Lo Siu Kei at HKFA
 

2001 births
Living people
Hong Kong footballers
Association football goalkeepers
Resources Capital FC players
Hong Kong Rangers FC players
Hong Kong Premier League players
Hong Kong First Division League players